Differdange Castle, located on a hill in the centre of Differdange in southern Luxembourg, was built in 1577 although an earlier fortified castle of Differdange dates from around 1310. Today's residential château is used by Miami University.

History

The first lord of Differdange Castle was Wilhelm, brother of the Lord of Soleuvre, who is mentioned in documents from 1310 when he owned a fortified castle. However, the lords of Differdange lasted only until the death of Wilhelm's grandson around the year 1400. When Soleuvre Castle burnt down in 1552, the owner Anna von Insenburg decided not to repair it but to build a Renaissance-style residential castle in Differdange serving both Soleuvre and Differdange.

At the beginning of the 20th century, the castle came into the hands of the local steel industry ARBED who used it as a hotel and a restaurant for its staff until it became a Miami University campus in 1997.

Architecture

Differdange Castle is probably the earliest example in Luxembourg of a château built entirely in the Renaissance style. It was intended as a residence and a fortification with a moat and draw-bridge (now both removed) as well as loop-holes. It is constructed fully in accordance with the principles of Renaissance architecture, especially the use of the square both for the courtyard (15 by 15 metres) and the outer walls of the three buildings (30 by 30 metres) which surround it. The rectangular cross-framed windows are typical of the period. The octagonal towers which are slightly higher than the central building provide balance between the horizontal and vertical dimensions.

The castle today

Since 1997, the castle has been let to Miami University for use as its Miami University Dolibois European Center, a European teaching centre providing students with "a living history for their European experience".  The center is named in honour of former American ambassador to Luxembourg, John E. Dolibois.

See also
List of castles in Luxembourg

Gallery

References

Castles in Luxembourg
Differdange
Miami University
Educational institutions in Luxembourg